Women's Electoral Lobby may refer to the following feminist lobby groups:

 Women's Electoral Lobby (Australia)
 Women's Electoral Lobby (New Zealand)